Shoaib Md Khan (born 1 September 1991) is an Indian cricketer. He made his Twenty20 debut for Andhra in the 2016–17 Inter State Twenty-20 Tournament on 29 January 2017. He made his first-class debut for Andhra in the 2017–18 Ranji Trophy on 6 October 2017. He made his List A debut for Andhra in the 2018–19 Vijay Hazare Trophy on 19 September 2018.

He was the joint-leading wicket-taker for Andhra in the 2018–19 Ranji Trophy, with 17 dismissals in seven matches.

References

External links
 

1991 births
Living people
Indian cricketers
Andhra cricketers
Place of birth missing (living people)